Candy Cane Lane is an upcoming American Christmas comedy film directed by Reginald Hudlin and written by Kelly Younger. The film stars Eddie Murphy, Tracee Ellis Ross, Robin Thede, Nick Offerman, Chris Redd and Jillian Bell. It will be distributed on Amazon Prime Video in 2023.

Cast
 Eddie Murphy
 Tracee Ellis Ross
 Robin Thede
 Nick Offerman
 Jillian Bell
 Chris Redd
 Genneya Walton
 Madison Thomas
 Thaddeus J. Mixson
 Danielle Pinnock
 Ken Marino
 Anjelah Johnson-Reyes
 D.C. Young Fly

Production
In July 2022, it was reported that Eddie Murphy will star and produce a new holiday comedy film for Amazon Prime Video. Reginald Hudlin, who directed Murphy in Boomerang (1992) will direct, while Kelly Younger wrote the script inspired by his childhood holiday experiences. In January 2023, Tracee Ellis Ross was cast opposite Murphy. Jillian Bell, Robin Thede, Nick Offerman, Chris Redd and Danielle Pinnock were cast in the film. 

Principal photography took place in Los Angeles, California, from December 2022 to February 2023.

References

External links

Upcoming English-language films
Upcoming films
Films shot in Los Angeles
American Christmas comedy films